Strongylognathus silvestrii is a species of ant in the genus Strongylognathus. It is endemic to Greece.

References

Strongylognathus
Endemic fauna of Greece
Hymenoptera of Europe
Insects described in 1936
Taxonomy articles created by Polbot